Anna Sabina Lambertz Küller (born 22 September 1994) is a Swedish ice hockey player and member of the Swedish national ice hockey team, currently playing for AIK Hockey Dam in the Swedish Women's Hockey League (SDHL). She has played the entirety of her senior club career with AIK IF and has served as the team's captain since 2016.

Playing career   
Küller began playing ice hockey at the age of 3 in Norrtälje, just outside of Stockholm. She grew up playing on mixed-gender teams until the age of nine, when an AIK coach scouted her for their girls' team. She would make her first Riksserien appearance with AIK in 2009–10 against Leksands IF, scoring her first goal on her first shot.

She was named AIK captain ahead of the 2016–17 SDHL season.

She missed seven weeks of the 2018–19 season after suffering a broken arm before the Christmas break. She ended up scoring 11 points in 26 games that season, her lowest total in six years as the team finished in 8th in the league for the first team in its history.

After scoring just one goal in her first 19 games in the 2020–21 SDHL season, she scored a hat-trick against Leksands IF in December 2020.

International 
Küller made her first senior IIHF World Championship appearance with Sweden at the 2015 IIHF Women's World Championship and has since competed in the 2016, 2017, and 2019 tournaments. She scored one goal and 3 points across six games in the women’s ice hockey tournament at the 2018 Winter Olympics.

Personal life   
In 2011, Küller suffered a serious health scare after accidentally receiving a morphine overdose at six times the standard adult dose while receiving treatment for a herniated disc at the hospital.

References

External links
 
 

1994 births
Living people
People from Norrtälje
Swedish women's ice hockey forwards
AIK Hockey Dam players
Olympic ice hockey players of Sweden
Ice hockey players at the 2018 Winter Olympics
Ice hockey players at the 2012 Winter Youth Olympics
Youth Olympic gold medalists for Sweden
Sportspeople from Stockholm County